The House or Kelya of The Blessed starets Saint Pavel of Taganrog is situated in the city of Taganrog on Turgenevsky Street 82 not far from The Saint Nicholas the Wonderworker Church and open to Russian Orthodox pilgrims.

Pavel of Taganrog spent about half of his Taganrog years in this house, which is commonly referred to as Kelya of Saint Starets Pavel of Taganrog. The house has never been renovated and the walls, icons, earthenware, tables and benches are all witnesses to the epoch. In the courtyard stands an old draw well, which is believed to be sanctified by John of Kronstadt.  

On 20 June 1999 the Russian Orthodox Church canonized Blessed Pavel. The saint starets' relics were transferred from his kelya on Ulitsa Turgenevskaya in Taganrog into Saint Nicholas the Wonderworker Church.

External links and references
 Encyclopedia of Taganrog, Anton Edition, Taganrog, 2008

Buildings and structures in Taganrog
Tourist attractions in Taganrog